Kodjo Fo-Doh Laba (born 27 January 1992) is a Togolese professional footballer who plays for UAE Pro-League side Al Ain, as a forward.

Club career
Born in Lomé, Laba has played for Anges FC, US Bitam and RS Berkane. He signed for Al Ain in June 2019. On 25 October 2019, Laba scored four goals in a 7–1 league win against Fujairah. On 21 February 2020, Laba again scored four times in a game; this coming in a 6–5 victory over Al Wasl in the quarter-finals of the UAE President's Cup.

International career
He made his international debut in 2016, and was named in the squad for the 2017 Africa Cup of Nations.

Career statistics

Club

International
Scores and results list Togo's goal tally first.

Honours
Individual
UAE Pro League Top Scorer: 2019–20, 2021–22
UAE Pro League Player of the Month: August 2021

References

1992 births
Living people
Togolese footballers
Togo international footballers
Anges FC players
US Bitam players
RS Berkane players
Al Ain FC players
Gabon Championnat National D1 players
Botola players
UAE Pro League players
Association football forwards
2017 Africa Cup of Nations players
Togolese expatriate footballers
Togolese expatriate sportspeople in Gabon
Expatriate footballers in Gabon
Togolese expatriate sportspeople in Morocco
Expatriate footballers in Morocco
Expatriate footballers in the United Arab Emirates
Sportspeople from Lomé
21st-century Togolese people